Commune IV (Niamey), also known as Niamey IV, is an urban commune in Niger. It is a commune of the capital city of Niamey.

Transport
The commune is served by Niamey railway station and Niamey International Airport.

References

External links

Commune 4